WETR (760 AM) is a daytime-only talk radio station in Knoxville, Tennessee.

Because it shares the same frequency with WJR in Detroit, Michigan, WETR-AM operates during the daytime hours only. WETR's FM translator 92.3 W222BA in Karns, Tennessee operates 24/7, but with a smaller coverage area over Central and East Knoxville.

Programming
As “Knoxville’s Talk You Can Trust,” WETR airs a line-up of conservative news and talk.

The station previously featured a local morning program called “Real News” with host Grant Henry and co-host Nick Crawford. Both left the station in 2019. "Real News" was the flagship program for WETR.

The morning show was immediately re-branded as “Knoxville’s Morning News,” featuring Hosts Daniel Herrera and   Elaine Davis. The new show continued the station's fierce opposition to Recode Knoxville  and other socialist policies. The show was produced by Rachel “Roz” Adams, who is also host of her own Podcast.

Local morning programming ended on January 10, 2020, replaced with the syndicated offerings of Gordon Deal and Glenn Beck.

Syndicated programs include daily shows This Morning with Gordon Deal, The Glenn Beck Program, The Eric Metaxas Show, The Joe Pags Show, The Dennis Prager Show, and George Noory’s Coast To Coast AM.

Hourly news updates are provided by Fox News Radio.

For the 2019 season, WETR was the flagship station for the Tennessee Smokies radio network.

History
WMEN, "The Spirit of 76", was an affiliate of Morningstar Radio Network.

At one time, WMEN was called "The Word" and shared its production director with WRJZ.

References

External links
Official website

ETR
ETR